Chasen is a Jewish surname. It derives from Hebrew chazan (חזן, "cantor"). Alternate spellings are Hazan and Chazan. Notable people with the surname include:

Frederick Nutter Chasen (1896–1942), English zoologist
Heather Chasen (1927–2020), English actress
Ronni Chasen (1946–2010), American film publicist
 Michael Chasen, American businessman and entrepreneur, CEO of SocialRadar, and Co-Founder of Blackboard Inc.